The Best of Jean-Luc Ponty is a compilation album by French jazz fusion artist Jean-Luc Ponty, released in 2002. It focuses on his work while on the Columbia label.

Track listing 
All songs by Jean-Luc Ponty unless otherwise noted.
 "Prologue" – 1:03
 "Faith in You" – 4:52
 "Tchokola" (Brice Wassy) – 5:48
 "Spring Episode" – 5:52
 "Metamorphosis" – 5:53
 "Tender Memories" – 5:20
 "Mouna Bowa" (Ponty, Guy N'Sangue) – 6:33
 "In the Fast Lane" – 4:10
 "The Gift of Time" – 5:06
 "After the Storm" – 4:21
 "Bottle Bop" (Yves N'Djock, Nsangue, Wassy) – 4:52
 "Prelude No. 20, Op. 28" (Chopin) – 2:59

Personnel
Jean-Luc Ponty – violin, synthesizer, Synclavier, keyboards
Rayford Griffin – drums, percussion
Baron Browne – bass
Jamie Glaser – guitar
Pat Thomi – guitar
Wally Mino – piano, keyboards
Clara Ponty – piano
Patrice Rushen – synthesizer
Grover Washington Jr. – synthesizer, soprano saxophone
Kurt Wortman – percussion
Martin Atangana – guitar
Yves N'Djock – guitar
Guy N'Sangue – bass
Brice Wassy – drums, percussion
Moustapha Cisse – percussion
Angélique Kidjo – vocals
Myriam Betty – vocals
Kémo Kouyaté – harp, background vocals, Balafon, Kora
Abdou M'Boup – percussion, bongos, vocals, Sabar, Tama, Bugarabu
Willy N'For – vocals

References

2002 greatest hits albums
Jean-Luc Ponty albums
Columbia Records compilation albums